The Couch-Marshall House is a historic house at 505 West Monroe Street in Magnolia, Arkansas.  The oldest portion of this house, now the rear, began as a vernacular Greek Revival cottage built c. 1840 by Thomas G. Couch.  In the 1890s this structure was significantly expanded and restyled in the then-popular Queen Anne style, although it retains some Plain Traditional influence.  It has the asymmetrical and irregular massing typical of the Queen Anne style, with gabled dormers and projecting gabled bays, and a porch with elaborate jigsaw-cut detailing.

The house was listed on the National Register of Historic Places in 1992.

See also
National Register of Historic Places listings in Columbia County, Arkansas

References

Houses on the National Register of Historic Places in Arkansas
Greek Revival houses in Arkansas
Queen Anne architecture in Arkansas
Houses completed in 1890
Houses in Columbia County, Arkansas
National Register of Historic Places in Columbia County, Arkansas
1890 establishments in Arkansas
Magnolia, Arkansas